The 2015–16 Mahindra Enforcer season was the second season of the franchise in the Philippine Basketball Association (PBA).

Key dates
 July 16: Columbian Autocar Corporation (CAC) announced that they changed their team name from Kia Carnival to Mahindra Enforcers.
August 23: The 2015 PBA draft took place in Midtown Atrium, Robinson Place Manila.

Draft picks

Roster

Philippine Cup

Eliminations

Standings

Commissioner's Cup

Eliminations

Standings

Governors' Cup

Eliminations

Standings

Bracket

Transactions

Trades
Pre-season

Recruited imports

References

Terrafirma Dyip seasons
Mahindra